Machteld Aelbrechtsdr van Wouw  (1580-1662) was a Dutch printer and publisher. 

She was the official state national publisher of the Dutch Republic between 1622 and 1662, with a monopoly on all government publications. She inherited the office from her late spouse Hillebrant Jacobsz. van Wouw (1577-1622), who in turn had inherited from her father Aelbrecht Hendricksz. van Leuningen (ca 1545-1613).

References 

 http://resources.huygens.knaw.nl/vrouwenlexicon/lemmata/data/Leuningen

1580 births
1662 deaths
17th-century Dutch businesswomen
17th-century Dutch businesspeople
17th-century publishers (people)
17th-century printers